Prudentópolis Esporte Clube, commonly known as Prudentópolis, is a Brazilian football club based in Prudentópolis, Paraná state. They competed in the Copa do Brasil once.

History
The club was founded on May 25, 1968. Prudentópolis won the Campeonato Paranaense Third Level in 1997 and competed in the Copa do Brasil in 2004, when they were eliminated in the second stage by Internacional.

Achievements

 Campeonato Paranaense Third Level:
 Winners (1): 1997

Stadium
Prudentópolis Esporte Clube play their home games at Estádio Newton Agibert. The stadium has a maximum capacity of 3,500 people.

References

Association football clubs established in 1968
Football clubs in Paraná (state)
1968 establishments in Brazil